The 2007 Island Games on the island of Rhodes was the 10th edition in which a men's Association football tournament was played at the multi-games competition. It was contested by 11 teams.

Gibraltar won the tournament for the first time.

Participants

Group Phase

Group A

Group B

Group C

Group D

Placement play-off & matches

9th – 11th place semi-final

5th – 8th place semi-finals

9th place match

7th place match

5th place match

Final stage

Semi-finals

3rd place match

Final

Final rankings

See also
Women's Football at the 2007 Island Games

External links
Official 2007 website

Men
2007
Gibraltar in international football